Stefania Sandrelli (born 5 June 1946) is an Italian actress, famous for her many roles in the commedia all'Italiana, starting from the 1960s. She was 14 years old when she starred in Divorce Italian Style as Angela, the cousin and love interest of Ferdinando, played by Marcello Mastroianni.

Early life
Sandrelli was born in Viareggio, Tuscany, into a middle-class family, the daughter of Florida and Otello Sandrelli (who died when she was eight years old), owners of a pension in Viareggio.

As a girl, Sandrelli studied ballet and learned to play the accordion.

Sandrelli had a brother, Sergio, seven years older, who had a successful music career and died in 2013.

Career
In 1960, Sandrelli won the Miss Cinema Viareggio beauty contest, then she was the cover girl of the magazine Le Ore, and had the first opportunities to make films, appearing, among others, in Luciano Salce's Il federale. Her film career was launched by Pietro Germi with Divorce Italian Style (1961); later, she worked three more times with Germi, in Seduced and Abandoned (1963), L'immorale (1967) and Alfredo, Alfredo (1970).

Sandrelli became in a short time a protagonist of the commedia all'italiana, appearing, among others, in Antonio Pietrangeli's Io la conoscevo bene, Mario Monicelli's Brancaleone alle crociate and Ettore Scola's C'eravamo tanto amati. She also starred in several Bernardo Bertolucci's drama films, including The Conformist (1970) and 1900 (1976), and in several French productions.

In 1980, she won the Nastro d'Argento for Best Supporting Actress thanks to her performance in Ettore Scola's La terrazza. In 1983, she relaunched her career with the Tinto Brass' erotic film The Key; following the success of the film she then acted in a series of successful erotic films.

On 10 September 2005, she received the Golden Lion for Lifetime Achievement at the 62nd Venice International Film Festival. On 11 May 2012, she received the title of Chevalier (Knight) of the Ordre des Arts et des Lettres.

Personal life

Sandrelli had a long relationship with Italian singer-songwriter Gino Paoli. Their daughter Amanda Sandrelli, born in 1964, is also an actress.

Selected filmography

 1961: Gioventù di notte - her first role
 1961: The Fascist (Il federale)
 1961: Divorce Italian Style (Divorzio all'italiana)
 1963: Il Fornaretto di Venezia
 1963: La bella di Lodi
 1964: Seduced and Abandoned (Sedotta e abbandonata)
 1965: I Knew Her Well (Io la conoscevo bene)
 1966: Tender Scoundrel (Tendre Voyou)
 1967: L'immorale
 1968: Partner
 1969: L'amante di Gramigna
 1970: Alfredo, Alfredo
 1970: Brancaleone at the Crusades (Brancaleone alle Crociate)
 1970: The Conformist (Il conformista)
 1972: Devil in the Brain (Il diavolo nel cervello)
 1974: Somewhere Beyond Love (Delitto d'amore)
 1974: We All Loved Each Other So Much (C'eravamo tanto amati)
 1976: 1900 (Novecento)
 1976: Death Rite (Les magiciens)
 1976: Strange Occasion (Quelle strane occasioni)
 1976: Police Python 357
 1979: Traffic Jam (L'Ingorgo: Una storia impossibile)
 1979: Where Are You Going on Holiday? (Dove vai in vacanza?)
 1980: La terrazza
 1980: 
 1981: My Darling, My Dearest (Bello mio, bellezza mia)
 1981: La disubbidienza
 1982: Eccezzziunale... veramente
 1983: Vacanze di Natale
 1983: The Key (La chiave)
 1984: Secrets Secrets (Segreti segreti)
 1985: Mamma Ebe
 1985: D'Annunzio
 1986: The American Bride (La sposa americana)
 1987: Let's Hope It's a Girl (Speriamo che sia femmina)
 1987: The Family (La famiglia)
 1987: The Gold Rimmed Glasses (Gli occhiali d'oro)
 1987:  (Noyade interdite)
 1987: Secondo Ponzio Pilato
 1988: Mignon Has Come to Stay (Mignon è partita)
 1988: The Sleazy Uncle (Lo zio indegno)
 1988: Stradivari
 1989: The Little Devil (Il piccolo diavolo)
 1990: Dark Illness (Il male oscuro)
 1990: The African Woman
 1990: Traces of an Amorous Life (Tracce di vita amorosa)
 1992: Jamón Jamón
 1994: Of Love and Shadows
 1994: With Closed Eyes (Con gli occhi chiusi)
 1995: Palermo - Milan One Way
 1996: Stealing Beauty
 1996: The Nymph (Ninfa plebea)
 1998: The Dinner (La cena)
 1998: We'll Really Hurt You (Le faremo tanto male)
 1998: Marriages (Matrimoni)
 2001: The Last Kiss (L'ultimo bacio)
 2002: Sons and Daughters (Figli/Hijos)
 2003: A Talking Picture (Um Filme Falado)
 2003: People of Rome (Gente di Roma)
 2003: Life as It Comes (La vita come viene)
 2010: The Woman of My Dreams
 2010: The First Beautiful Thing (La prima cosa bella)
 2010: The Passion (La passione)

References

Further reading
 Ezio Alberione, Gianni Canova, Francesco Miuccio, Stefania Sandrelli, Papageno, 1998

External links

 

1946 births
Living people
People from Viareggio
Italian film actresses
David di Donatello winners
Nastro d'Argento winners
Ciak d'oro winners
Chevaliers of the Ordre des Arts et des Lettres
20th-century Italian actresses
21st-century Italian actresses
Italian television actresses